Izet Hajrović (born 4 August 1991) is a Bosnian professional footballer who plays as a winger for Super League Greece club Aris.

Hajrović started his professional career at Grasshoppers, before joining Galatasaray in 2014. Later that year, he switched to Werder Bremen, who loaned him to Eibar in 2015. Three years later, Hajrović signed with Dinamo Zagreb. He moved to Aris in 2021.

A former Swiss youth international, Hajrović even made his senior international debut for Switzerland, only to switch his allegiance to Bosnia and Herzegovina in 2013, earning over 20 caps until 2019. He represented the nation at their first major championship, the 2014 FIFA World Cup.

Club career

Early career
Hajrović started playing football at local clubs, before joining Grasshoppers' youth academy in 2000. He made his professional debut against Luzern on 3 October 2009 at the age of 18. On 19 September 2010, he scored a brace, which were his first professional goals. He scored his first career hat-trick on 17 September 2011.

Galatasaray

In January 2014, Hajrović was transferred to Turkish outfit Galatasaray for an undisclosed fee. He made his official debut for the team on 2 February against Bursaspor. On 5 February, he scored his first goal for Galatasaray in Turkish Cup game against Tokatspor.

Hajrović debuted in UEFA Champions League against Chelsea on 26 February.

He won his first trophy with the club on 7 May, by beating Eskişehirspor in Turkish Cup final.

Werder Bremen
In July, Hajrović signed a four-year contract with German side Werder Bremen. He made his competitive debut for the club in DFB-Pokal match against FV Illertissen on 17 August and managed to score a goal. A week later, he made his league debut against Hertha BSC. On 26 April 2015, he scored his first league goal against Paderborn 07.

In August, Hajrović was sent on a season-long loan to Spanish outfit Eibar.

In December 2016, he suffered a severe knee injury, which was diagnosed as anterior cruciate ligament tear and was ruled out for at least six months. He returned to the pitch on 16 September 2017, over nine months after the injury.

Dinamo Zagreb
In January 2018, Hajrović moved to Croatian side Dinamo Zagreb on a deal until June 2019. He debuted officially for the team on 10 February against Osijek. On 4 April, he scored his first goal for Dinamo Zagreb in Croatian Cup tie against Rijeka. He won his first title with the club on 13 May, when they were crowned league champions. On 2 February 2019, he scored a brace against Rudeš, his first league goals for Dinamo Zagreb.

In July, he extended his contract until June 2021.

Aris
In June 2021, Hajrović joined Greek outfit Aris on a three-year deal. He debuted competitively for the club in UEFA Europa Conference League qualifier against Astana on 22 July. Seven weeks later, he made his league debut against OFI.

International career

After representing Switzerland at various youth levels, Hajrović made his senior international debut in a friendly game against Tunisia on 14 November 2012. However, in June 2013, he decided that he would play for Bosnia and Herzegovina in the future.

In August, his request to change sports citizenship from Swiss to Bosnian was approved by FIFA. Later that month, he received his first senior call-up, for 2014 FIFA World Cup qualifiers against Slovakia, home and away. He debuted in the home game on 6 September. On 10 September, in the away game, Hajrović scored his first senior international goal, which secured the victory for his team.

In June 2014, Hajrović was named in Bosnia and Herzegovina's squad for 2014 FIFA World Cup, country's first major competition. He made his tournament debut in the opening group match against Argentina on 15 June.

Personal life
Hajrović's younger brother Sead is also a professional footballer. They played together in Grasshoppers, before Sead joined Arsenal's youth academy in July 2009.

He married his long-time girlfriend Lejla in May 2014.

Hajrović is a practising Muslim; along with international teammates Ibrahim Šehić, Muhamed Bešić, Armin Hodžić, Sead Kolašinac, Edin Višća and Ervin Zukanović he visited a mosque in Zenica during national team concentration.

Career statistics

Club

International

Scores and results list Bosnia and Herzegovina's goal tally first, score column indicates score after each Hajrović goal.

Honours
Grasshoppers
Swiss Cup: 2012–13

Galatasaray
Turkish Cup: 2013–14

Dinamo Zagreb
Croatian First League: 2017–18, 2018–19, 2019–20, 2020–21
Croatian Cup: 2017–18, 2020–21
Croatian Super Cup: 2019

References

External links

1991 births
Living people
People from Brugg
Sportspeople from Aargau
Swiss people of Bosnia and Herzegovina descent
Citizens of Bosnia and Herzegovina through descent
Swiss men's footballers
Switzerland youth international footballers
Switzerland under-21 international footballers
Switzerland international footballers
Swiss expatriate footballers
Bosnia and Herzegovina footballers
Bosnia and Herzegovina international footballers
Bosnia and Herzegovina expatriate footballers
Dual internationalists (football)
Association football wingers
Grasshopper Club Zürich players
Galatasaray S.K. footballers
SV Werder Bremen players
SD Eibar footballers
GNK Dinamo Zagreb players
Aris Thessaloniki F.C. players
Swiss Super League players
Süper Lig players
Bundesliga players
La Liga players
Croatian Football League players
Super League Greece players
Expatriate footballers in Turkey
Expatriate footballers in Germany
Expatriate footballers in Spain
Expatriate footballers in Croatia
Expatriate footballers in Greece
Swiss expatriate sportspeople in Turkey
Swiss expatriate sportspeople in Germany
Swiss expatriate sportspeople in Spain
Swiss expatriate sportspeople in Croatia
Swiss expatriate sportspeople in Greece
Bosnia and Herzegovina expatriate sportspeople in Switzerland
Bosnia and Herzegovina expatriate sportspeople in Turkey
Bosnia and Herzegovina expatriate sportspeople in Germany
Bosnia and Herzegovina expatriate sportspeople in Spain
Bosnia and Herzegovina expatriate sportspeople in Croatia
Bosnia and Herzegovina expatriate sportspeople in Greece
2014 FIFA World Cup players